Qatar competed at the 2022 World Games held in Birmingham, United States from 7 to 17 July 2022. Athletes representing Qatar won one silver medal and the country finished in 63rd place in the medal table.

Medalists

Competitors
The following is the list of number of competitors in the Games.

Beach handball

Qatar won the silver medal in the men's beach handball tournament.

Cue sports

Qatar competed in cue sports.

References

Nations at the 2022 World Games
2022
World Games